Bridge in Upper Merion Township is a historic stone arch bridge located at Gulph Mills in Upper Merion Township, Montgomery County, Pennsylvania. The bridge was built in 1789. The bridge crosses Gulph Creek. 

It was listed on the National Register of Historic Places in 1988. The Bridge in Upper Mention is, as of August 2021, the fifth oldest bridge in use in the United States.

In 2021, the bridge structure was repaired and rehabilitated by contractor J.D. Eckman, with 100% funding from PennDOT.

References 

Road bridges on the National Register of Historic Places in Pennsylvania
Bridges completed in 1789
Bridges in Montgomery County, Pennsylvania
1789 establishments in Pennsylvania
National Register of Historic Places in Montgomery County, Pennsylvania
Upper Merion Township, Montgomery County, Pennsylvania
Stone arch bridges in the United States